Murung Raya Regency is the most northerly of the thirteen regencies (kabupaten) which comprise the province of Central Kalimantan on the island of Borneo, Indonesia. The capital of the regency is Puruk Cahu. Prior to the 2002 reorganization, this regency was part of the North Barito Regency. The regency had a population of 96,857 inhabitants at the 2010 census (an increase from 74,050 within the current area at the previous census in 2000) and 111,527 at the 2020 census; the official estimate as at mid 2021 was 112,445.

Administrative Districts 
Murung Raya Regency consists of ten districts (kecamatan), tabulated below with their areas and population totals from the 2010 census and the 2020 census, together with the official estimates as at mid 2021. The 2020 figures are rounded to the nearest 100 people. The table also includes the locations of the district administrative centres, the number of administrative villages (rural desa and urban kelurahan) in each district, and its postal codes.

Geography
The regency has an area of 23,700 km2 and lies between 114°27'00 to 115°49'00 East longitude and 0°58'30 North latitude to 1°26'00 South latitude. It occupies the valleys and foothills of the southern and eastern slopes of the Müller Mountains, and rises to 1730 m at Mount Lesung on its northern border. Most of the riverine area lies at an altitude of 100 to 200 m above sea level while the foothills are mostly at an altitude of 400–500 m.

The Betikap and Sepathawung valleys, in the northwest part of the regency have been declared protected areas for orangutans.  The Tumbang Topus caves have been the source of discovery of a number of new species.

Economy
Most of the population lives along rivers and relies on them for transportation, food, and agriculture. Aside from the predominant subsistence fishing and farming, the biggest contributors to the economy are forestry and mining. Timber, including high value trees such as Ulin (Eusideroxylon zwageri) and Meranti (genus Shorea),  has been commercially extracted since the 1920s, while the mining sector, such as gold and tin mining, has developed since World War II. In the 1990s coal exploration began, and in the 2000s the Haju coal mine started to be developed.

Climate
Puruk Cahu, the seat of the regency has a tropical rainforest climate (Af) with heavy to very heavy rainfall year-round.

Notes

External links
 

Regencies of Central Kalimantan
2002 establishments in Indonesia